Irén Rostás is a Hungarian orienteering competitor. At the 1976 World Orienteering Championships in Aviemore she received a bronze medal in the relay with the Hungarian team (with Magda Kovács and Sarolta Monspart). In  1979 she finished 12th in the individual event, and in  1983 she finished 9th in the individual and 6th in relay event.

References

Year of birth missing (living people)
Living people
Hungarian orienteers
Female orienteers
Foot orienteers
World Orienteering Championships medalists